KYRN (102.1 FM) is a radio station licensed to Socorro, New Mexico.  KRYN is owned and operated by Socorro Community Radio.  The format of the station is a Classic Country music that broadcasts local and national news, weather, and Socorro High School sports. The station has a live morning program, Sunrise Socorro, hosted by Steve Edmondson that features commentary, interviews with local leaders, Socorro High School coaches, and others from the community.

References

External links
KYRN's website socorroradio.com 

YRN
Classic country radio stations in the United States